Totally F***ed Up (also known as Totally Fucked Up) is a 1993 American drama film written and directed by Gregg Araki. The first installment of Araki's Teenage Apocalypse film trilogy, it is considered a seminal entry in the New Queer Cinema genre.

The film chronicles the dysfunctional lives of six gay adolescents who have formed a family unit and struggle to get along with each other and with life in the face of various major obstacles. Araki classified it as "a rag-tag story of the fag-and-dyke teen underground....a kinda cross between avant-garde experimental cinema and a queer John Hughes flick." It premiered at the 1993 Sundance Film Festival.

Plot
The plot is concerned with six teenagers, four of whom are gay men, the other two a "traditional" lesbian couple. The plot is episodic, spliced with segments of other material and occasional tangents not central to the plot, but it mainly follows a linear structure. Araki has constructed the film in 15 parts, which is described in the opening titles.

The film details the lives and romances of the six characters, before ultimately culminating at a climax at which there is an epilogue-like reaction from five of the characters before the film ends and the blue font credits appear.

Cast
 James Duval as Andy
 Roko Belic as Tommy
 Susan Behshid as Michele
 Jenee Gill as Patricia
 Gilbert Luna as Steven
 Lance May as Deric
 Alan Boyce as Ian
 Craig Gilmore as Brendan
 Nicole Dillenberg as Dominatrix

Production
Araki has said they shot on 16mm film without permits and that the film had "virtually no crew" and that he operated the camera himself, accompanied by only a sound person and producer/PA, and the cast.

Style
The film makes extensive use of a handheld video camcorder, which one of the characters uses to provide insight into the lives of other characters through interview-like discussion. The technique became popular throughout the 1990s, evident also in such later films as Reality Bites (1994), American Beauty (1999) and The Blair Witch Project (1999). Araki himself revisited the camcorder idea in his 1997 film Nowhere.

Home media
The film was released on Region 1 DVD on June 28, 2005. The film also has a region 2 release in the UK and Germany. These releases feature a commentary track with Araki, Luna and Duval.

Year-end lists
 6th – Kevin Thomas, Los Angeles Times

See also
 Gregg Araki
 The Doom Generation (1995)
 Nowhere (1997)

References

External links
 
 
 
 
Screen Slate write-up by Mark Lukenbill

1993 films
1990s teen drama films
1993 LGBT-related films
American teen drama films
American teen LGBT-related films
1990s English-language films
Films directed by Gregg Araki
Films about drugs
American independent films
Gay-related films
Lesbian-related films
HIV/AIDS in American films
Films produced by Andrea Sperling
1993 drama films
1994 drama films
1994 films
1993 independent films
1990s American films